The National Cancer Research Network (NCRN) is a UK based government funding utility created to provide infrastructure to the UK's National Health Service (NHS) and increase funding for clinical trials.

History
NCRN was created in April 2001 by the UK's Department of Health.

Stated goal
The stated goal of NCRN:
To improve the speed, quality and integration of research with the ultimate aim of improving patient care. NCRN was established by the Department of Health in April 2001 and has already succeeded in doubling patient accrual into cancer clinical trials.

See also 
 National Health Service

References

External links 
 National Cancer Research Network
 National Health Service

National Health Service (England)
Medical research institutes in the United Kingdom